Pseuduvarus vitticollis, is a species of predaceous diving beetle found in India, Nepal, Pakistan, Sri Lanka, China, Madagascar, Malaysia, Taiwan and African region.

Description
The cervical streak between the eyes is absent. The streaks imprinted along the elithral suture are also absent. the striae discs of the elytra are completely absent or reduced to an obsolete basal dimple. In male genitalia, parameres made up of three segments.

References 

Dytiscidae
Insects of Sri Lanka
Beetles described in 1848